Carlos Verdejo (2 October 1934 – 24 January 2017) was a Chilean footballer.

Honours

Club
Deportes La Serena
 Segunda División: 1957
 Copa Chile: 1960

Individual
 Campeonato Nacional (Chile) Top-Scorer: 1958

References

1934 births
2017 deaths
Sportspeople from Valparaíso
Primera B de Chile players
Chilean Primera División players
Everton de Viña del Mar footballers
Deportes La Serena footballers
Santiago Wanderers footballers
Club Deportivo Palestino footballers
Association football forwards
Chilean footballers